Antonia Minor (31 January 36 BC - 1 May 37 AD)  was the younger of two surviving daughters of Mark Antony and Octavia Minor. She was a niece of the Emperor Augustus, sister-in-law of the Emperor Tiberius, paternal grandmother of the Emperor Caligula and Empress Agrippina the Younger, mother of the Emperor Claudius, and maternal great-grandmother of the Emperor Nero. She outlived her husband Drusus, her oldest son, her daughter, and several of her grandchildren.

Biography

Birth and early life
She was born in Athens, and after 36 BC was taken to Rome by her mother with her siblings. She was the youngest of five. Her mother had three children, named Claudia Marcella Major, Claudia Marcella Minor, and Marcus Claudius Marcellus, from her first marriage and another daughter, named Antonia Major, by the same father (Mark Antony). Antonia never knew her father; Mark Antony divorced her mother in 32 BC and committed suicide in 30 BC.

She was raised by her mother, her uncle, and her aunt, Livia Drusilla. Having inherited properties in Italy, Greece, and Egypt, she was a wealthy and influential woman, who often received visitors to Rome. She had many male friends, including Alexander the Alabarch, a wealthy Jew, and Lucius Vitellius, a consul and the father of Aulus Vitellius, a future emperor.

Marriage and family
In 16 BC, she married the Roman general and future consul (9 BC) Nero Claudius Drusus. Drusus was the stepson of her uncle Augustus, second son of Livia Drusilla, and brother of future Emperor Tiberius. They had many children, but only three survived: the famous general Germanicus, Livilla, and the Roman Emperor Claudius.

A poem by Crinagoras of Mytilene mentions Antonia's first pregnancy, which may be of a child before Germanicus who must have died in infancy or early childhood.

Drusus died in June 9 BC in Germany, due to complications from injuries he sustained after falling from a horse. After his death, although pressured by her uncle to remarry, she never did.

Antonia raised her children in Rome. Tiberius adopted Germanicus in 4 AD. Germanicus died in 19 AD, allegedly poisoned through the handiwork of Gnaeus Calpurnius Piso and Munatia Plancina. Tacitus suggests but does not outright say in Annals 3.3 that, on the orders of Tiberius and Livia Drusilla, Antonia was forbidden to go to his funeral. When Livia Drusilla died in June of 29 AD, Antonia took care of her younger grandchildren Caligula, Agrippina the Younger, Julia Drusilla, Julia Livilla, and later Claudia Antonia.

Conflict with Livilla
In 31 AD, a plot by her daughter Livilla and Tiberius’ notorious Praetorian prefect, Sejanus, to murder the Emperor Tiberius and Caligula and to seize the throne for themselves,  was exposed by Apicata, the estranged ex-wife of Sejanus. Livilla allegedly poisoned her husband, Tiberius' son, Drusus Julius Caesar (nicknamed "Castor"), in 23 AD to remove him as a rival.

Sejanus was executed before Livilla was implicated in the crime. After Apicata's accusation, which came in the form of a letter to the emperor, several co-conspirators were executed while Livilla was handed over to her formidable mother for punishment. Cassius Dio states that Antonia imprisoned Livilla in her room until she starved to death.

Succession of Caligula and death
When Tiberius died, Caligula became emperor in March 37 AD. Caligula awarded her a senatorial decree, granting her all the honors that Livia Drusilla had received in her lifetime. She was also offered the title of Augusta, previously only given to Augustus's wife Livia, but rejected it.

Antonia would often offer Caligula advice, but he once told her, "I can treat anyone exactly as I please!" Having had enough of Caligula's anger at her criticisms and of his behavior, she committed suicide. Suetonius Caligula 23, relates how he might have poisoned her.When his grandmother Antonia asked for a private interview, he refused it except in the presence of the prefect Macro, and by such indignities and annoyances he caused her death; although some think that he also gave her poison. After she was dead, he paid her no honour, but viewed her burning pyre from his dining-room.

Antonia died on 1 May 37.

When Claudius became emperor after his nephew's assassination in 41 AD, he gave his mother the title of Augusta. Her birthday became a public holiday, which had yearly games and public sacrifices held. An image of her was paraded in a carriage.

Cultural depictions
She is remembered in De Mulieribus Claris, a collection of biographies of historical and mythological women by the Florentine author Giovanni Boccaccio, composed in 136162. It is notable as the first collection devoted exclusively to biographies of women in Western literature. Antonia is one of the main characters in the novel I, Claudius. In the  television adaptation of the book she is portrayed by Margaret Tyzack.  She is a loyal wife deeply in love with her husband Nero Claudius Drusus. However, she is unloving towards her son Claudius, whom she regards as a fool.  Furthermore, after finding evidence that Livilla murdered her husband Drusus Julius Caesar and rightfully believing she was also poisoning her daughter for the same reason, she kills Livilla by locking her in her room until she starves to death.  During the reign of Caligula she is so disgusted by the state of Rome that she commits suicide.

She is a leading character in the novel by Lindsey Davis, The Course of Honour (1997), where she guides and advises Claudius and his supporters.

In the 1968 ITV historical drama The Caesars, Antonia was indirectly mentioned by Tiberius (played by André Morell), who noted that Germanicus was a blood relative of Augustus on his mother's [Antonia] side.

Colleen Dewhurst portrayed Antonia opposite Susan Sarandon as Livilla in the 1985 miniseries A.D.

Notes

References

Sources

Ancient
 Plutarch - Life of Mark Antony
 Suetonius - Caligula (Gaius) & Claudius
 Tacitus - Annals of Imperial Rome
 Valerius Maximus, Factorum et dictorum memorabilium libri iv.3.3

Secondary
 (edd.), Prosopographia Imperii Romani saeculi I, II et III, Berlin, 1933 - . (PIR2)

36 BC births
37 deaths
1st-century BC Roman women
1st-century BC Romans
1st-century Roman women
Ancient Romans who committed suicide
Antonii
Augustae
Children of Mark Antony
Claudius
Julio-Claudian dynasty
Roman-era Athenian women